Jonathan Zwikel (born 16 July 1975) is a French ice hockey player. He competed in the men's tournaments at the 1998 Winter Olympics and the 2002 Winter Olympics. He is the son-in-law of Luc Tardif and brother-in-law of Luc Tardif Jr.

Career statistics

References

External links
 

1975 births
Living people
Dragons de Rouen players
Füchse Duisburg players
Gothiques d'Amiens players
HC Morzine-Avoriaz players
Hockey Club de Reims players
IF Sundsvall Hockey players
Olympic ice hockey players of France
Ice hockey players at the 1998 Winter Olympics
Ice hockey players at the 2002 Winter Olympics
Sportspeople from Brussels